The 1934 Dartmouth Indians football team was an American football team that represented Dartmouth College as an independent during the 1934 college football season. In their first season under head coach Earl Blaik, the Indians compiled a 6–3 record. George Hill was the team captain.

Phil Conti was the team's leading scorer, with 30 points, from five touchdowns.

Dartmouth played its home games at Memorial Field on the college campus in Hanover, New Hampshire.

Schedule

References

Dartmouth
Dartmouth Big Green football seasons
Dartmouth Indians football